Al-Jayyid (also spelled al-Jid or al-Jayyad) is a village in northern Syria located in the Qalaat al-Madiq Subdistrict of the al-Suqaylabiyah District in Hama Governorate. According to the Syria Central Bureau of Statistics (CBS), al-Jayyid had a population of 2,242 in the 2004 census. Its inhabitants are predominantly Alawites.

References 

Alawite communities in Syria
Populated places in al-Suqaylabiyah District
Populated places in al-Ghab Plain